The  New England Steamrollers season was the first and only season for the Arena Football League franchise. Concert and fight promoter, Frank J. Russo, and jeweler, Robert Andreoli, purchased a limited partnership from the Arena Football League to own the rights to a Providence, Rhode Island team. The team's first move was the hiring of Head Coach Babe Parilli in March. After a 3–9 season, the Steamrollers didn't achieve the dollar amount that Russo and Andreoli thought they would, and the franchise folded.

Regular season

Schedule

Standings

y – clinched regular-season title

x – clinched playoff spot

Roster

Awards

References

External links
New England Steamrollers season at arenafan.com

1988 Arena Football League season
1988 in sports in Rhode Island